The School for Scandal is a 1923 British silent comedy film directed by Bertram Phillips and starring Queenie Thomas, Frank Stanmore, and Basil Rathbone. It is an adaptation of the play The School for Scandal by Richard Brinsley Sheridan.

Cast

References

External links

Review with stills at moviessilently.com
Discussion of the film at jazzageclub.com

1923 films
1923 comedy films
British black-and-white films
British silent feature films
Films directed by Bertram Phillips
British films based on plays
British comedy films
1920s English-language films
1920s British films
Silent comedy films